Camden Township can be referred to:

 Camden Township, Kent County, Ontario, a former geographic township within Kent County, Ontario; now part of Chatham-Kent, Ontario
 Camden Township, Addington County, Ontario, a former geographic township within Addington County, Ontario; now part of Stone Mills Township, Lennox and Addington County, Ontario

Former municipalities in Ontario
Geographic townships in Ontario